Wings over Everest is a 1934 British short documentary film directed by Geoffrey Barkas and Ivor Montagu. It won an Academy Award in 1936 for Best Short Subject (Novelty). It described the 1933 Houston-Mount Everest flight expedition, in which  Douglas Douglas-Hamilton, 14th Duke of Hamilton, otherwise known as Lord Clydesdale, piloted a single-engined biplane on 3 April 1933, just clearing Everest's southern peak by a few feet, having been caught in a powerful downdraught. The film used mixture of real footage of Everest from the record-breaking flight and theatrically produced scenes using the actual people rather than actors.

The flight used two aircraft that took off from  Purnea, India on 3 April 1933. One aircraft was  Westland PV-3 which had undergone some additional changes, and the other aircraft was a Westland PV-6. Lord Clydesdale flew the PV-3 and Lieutenant David McIntyre in the PV-6. The aircraft were not pressurized but they did use bottled oxygen.

As mentioned, the film about this flight won an Oscar in the United States in 1936, in addition, aerial photos would go onto be used by mountaineers including Tenzing and Hillary's expedition which reached the summit on foot. The aerial photos were made on a second flight on 19 April 1933 as during the first flight there was a dusty haze that obscured the photographs from the 3 April flight.

Wings over Everest was preserved by the Academy Film Archive in 2014, in partnership with the UCLA Film and Television Archive.

See also
List of media related to Mount Everest
List of Mount Everest records

References

External links
 New York Times: Wings Over Everest

1934 films
1934 short films
1934 documentary films
1930s short documentary films
British short documentary films
British black-and-white films
Black-and-white documentary films
Documentary films about aviation
Films about Mount Everest
Live Action Short Film Academy Award winners
Films directed by Geoffrey Barkas
1930s English-language films
1930s British films